Cleotis Pendarvis (born June 22, 1986) is an American professional boxer.

Professional career
In April 2006, he beat the veteran Ricardo Galindo by unanimous decision.

On September 15, 2006 Cleotis fought to a draw against David Rodela in Montebello, California.

Pendarvis was one of the sparring partners of Antonio Margarito for his November 13, 2010 fight with Manny Pacquiao.

Professional record

|- style="margin:0.5em auto; font-size:95%;"
|align="center" colspan=8|17 Wins (6 knockouts, 11 decisions), 4 Losses (2 knockouts, 2 decisions), 2 Draws|- style="margin:0.5em auto; font-size:95%;"
|align=center style="border-style: none none solid solid; background: #e3e3e3"|Res.|align=center style="border-style: none none solid solid; background: #e3e3e3"|Record|align=center style="border-style: none none solid solid; background: #e3e3e3"|Opponent|align=center style="border-style: none none solid solid; background: #e3e3e3"|Type|align=center style="border-style: none none solid solid; background: #e3e3e3"|Rd., Time|align=center style="border-style: none none solid solid; background: #e3e3e3"|Date|align=center style="border-style: none none solid solid; background: #e3e3e3"|Location|align=center style="border-style: none none solid solid; background: #e3e3e3"|Notes'''
|-align=center
|-align=center
|Loss|| 17-4-2 ||align=left| Dierry Jean
|||  ||   || align=left|  
|align=left| 
|-align=center
|Win|| 17-3-2 ||align=left| Michael Clark
|||  ||   || align=left|  
|align=left| 
|-align=center
|Win|| 16-3-2 ||align=left| Robert Frankel
|||  ||   || align=left|  
|align=left| 
|-align=center
|Win|| 15-3-2 ||align=left| Luis Alfredo Lugo
|||  ||   || align=left| 
|align=left|
|-align=center
|Win|| 14-3-2 ||align=left| Fernando Rodriguez
|||  ||   || align=left|  
|align=left|
|-align=center
|Win|| 13-3-2 ||align=left| Rogelio De la Torre
|||  ||   || align=left| 
|align=left|
|-align=center
|Win|| 12-3-2 ||align=left| Larry Smith
|||  ||   || align=left| 
|align=left|
|-align=center
|Loss|| 11-3-2 ||align=left| Terrance Cauthen
|||  ||   || align=left| 
|align=left|
|-align=center
|Win|| 11-2-2 ||align=left| Hector Sanchez
|||  ||   || align=left| 
|align=left|
|-align=center
|Loss|| 10-2-2 ||align=left| Mauricio Herrera
|||  ||   || align=left| 
|align=left|
|-align=center
|Win|| 10-1-2 ||align=left| Steve Quinonez
|||  ||   || align=left|  
|align=left|
|-align=center
|Win|| 9-1-2 ||align=left| Sergio Joel De La Torre
|||  ||   || align=left|  
|align=left|
|-align=center
|style="background: #dae2f1"|Draw|| 8-1-2 ||align=left| Mario Alberto Altamirano Becerra
|||  ||   || align=left|  
|align=left|
|-align=center
|Win|| 8-1-1 ||align=left| John Lewis
|||  ||   || align=left| 
|align=left|
|-align=center
|Win|| 7-1-1 ||align=left| Anthony Martinez
|||   ||   || align=left|  
|align=left|
|-align=center
|Win|| 6-1-1 ||align=left| Leonel Madrigal
|||  ||   || align=left|  
|align=left|
|-align=center
|style="background: #dae2f1"|Draw|| 5-1-1 ||align=left| David Rodela
|||  ||   || align=left| 
|align=left| 
|-align=center
|Loss|| 5-1-0 ||align=left| Noel Rodriguez
|||  ||   || align=left| 
|align=left|
|-align=center
|Win|| 5-0-0 ||align=left| Ricardo Galindo
|||  ||   || align=left| 
|align=left|
|-align=center
|Win|| 4-0-0 ||align=left| Alfredo Rivera
|||  ||   || align=left| 
|align=left|
|-align=center
|Win|| 3-0-0 ||align=left| Juan Joaquin Perez
|||  ||   || align=left| 
|align=left|
|-align=center
|Win|| 2-0-0 ||align=left| Alex Ramirez
|||  ||   || align=left| 
|align=left|
|-align=center
|Win|| 1-0-0 ||align=left| Steve Parker
|||  ||   || align=left|  
|align=left|

References

External links

Living people
1982 births
American male boxers
Welterweight boxers
Southpaw boxers
Boxers from California